Kabgian District is a district (bakhsh) in Dana County, Kohgiluyeh and Boyer-Ahmad Province, Iran. In the 2006 census, its population was 10,391 in 2,228 families.  The district has one city: Chitab.  The District has two rural districts (dehestan): Chenar Rural District and Kabgian Rural District.

References 

Districts of Kohgiluyeh and Boyer-Ahmad Province
Dana County